Hum Sab Ustad Hain is a 1965 Hindi film starring Kishore Kumar, Dara Singh and Ameeta.

Plot
As the film begins, Romi (Sheikh Mukhtar) shoots a man but does not kill him. However, he is arrested, convicted, and sentenced to jail for the murder. His pregnant wife Radha (Lalita Kumari) throws herself into the river, but is later saved by a villager who accepts her and her son Ram (Dara Singh). After 14 years in jail, Romi wanders for eight more years. Being rejected by the society and unable to find a job, Romi turns to crime. When his gang is offered a large sum of money to smuggle national secrets, he kidnaps a young child and forces her sister Roopa (Ameeta) to carry the smuggled goods. Roopa, who would rather die than betray her country, loses control of her car and drives straight into a river. She survives and is washed ashore in the village where Radha and Ram live. Meanwhile, an unemployed Kishore (Kishore Kumar) decides to play detective and find the lost girl Radha and her sister. He tracks her down in the village and instantly falls in love with her. Romi and his gang also track her down and go to the city to help save her sister. At this point, Romi becomes a wrestler. Romi kidnaps Radha and realizes that they are his long-lost family. He then decides to sacrifice himself for his family to show them that his heart is still honest and that he has always loved them.

Cast
Ameeta as Roopa
Bela Bose
Edwina Lyons as  Dancer
Ratan Gaurang as Henchman
King Kong as King Kong, Wrestler
Kishore Kumar as Kishore
Lalita Kumari as Radha
Sheikh Mukhtar as Radha's husband
Nasreen
Maruti Rao as Sattar
Dara Singh as Ram 'Ramu'

Soundtrack
Lyrics by Asad Bhopali, Music by Laxmikant Pyarelal

References

External links

Films scored by Laxmikant–Pyarelal
1960s Hindi-language films